A sex shop  is a retailer that sells products related to adult sexual or erotic entertainment, such as sex toys, lingerie, pornography, and other related products. 

An early precursor of the modern sex shop was a chain of stores set up in the 1920s by Léon Vidal of Diana Slip fame, in Paris. His shops sold erotic books, photographs and lingerie. 

Supposedly the world's first "official" sex shop was opened in 1962 by Beate Uhse AG in Flensburg, West Germany, and sex shops can now be found in many countries and online. Sex shops are part of the sex industry. In most jurisdictions, sex shops are regulated by law, with access not legally permitted to minors, the age depending on local law. Some jurisdictions prohibit sex shops and the merchandise they sell. In some jurisdictions that permit it, they may also show pornographic movies in private video booths, or have private striptease or peep shows. Also an adult movie theater may be attached. There are also many online sex shops selling a variety of adult content such as sex toys, pornographic magazines, pornographic films and fetish wear etc. These types of shop are often favoured by the consumer as they have less overheads and can be perused within the comfort of the home. Their discreetness is also appealing to some.

Terminology
Sex shops may also be an called adult shop, erotic shop, adult entertainment store, or adult book store. In some jurisdictions, polite euphemisms are used such as "marital aid store" or "adult novelties store".

History

Australia 
Sex shops have operated in Australia since the 1960s, first in the urban areas of Sydney, notably Kings Cross. The development of sex shops in the country was assisted by the legalisation of the import of pornographic magazines in 1971, the appearance of mass-produced battery-powered vibrators in the 1970s and the arrival of X-rated videos in the 1980s. The popularity of Internet pornography in the 2000s resulted in a drop in sex shop sales, some store closures and diversification into non-sex-related adult goods.

Sex shops in Australia are regulated by state laws and are subject to local planning controls. While laws differ between states, licensees must abide by strict conditions that commonly require premises to be at least 200 metres from schools and churches. Windows are often required to be blacked out and admission restricted to over 18s, with offences prosecuted by police under section 578E of the Crimes Act.

In the state of New South Wales (NSW) sex shops cannot trade at street level and are required to trade either above or below ground. Under NSW law, non-contraceptive sex products can be sold only in shops that have been granted a restricted premise licence by local councils. Nevertheless, by 2013 a number of NSW lingerie stores had begun selling adult toys and books in shopping malls without being granted a licence.

China 
Mainland China's first sex shop opened in Beijing in 1993 and by 2013 there were over 2,000 sex shops in the city. Most of their products were made in China.

Canada 
The first sex shop in North America was called The Garden. It was opened in October 1971 by Ivor Sargent on Crescent Street in downtown Montreal, Quebec. The Garden combined the concepts used by Beate Uhse in Germany and Ann Summers in the UK. The store's opening attracted long lines of shoppers. The Palm Beach Post commented: "Like the chicken or the egg controversy, no one is really sure which came first-the sex boutique or the so-called sexual revolution".

There are no specific laws against using or buying sex toys at any particular age, but there are laws restricting the purchase of pornography. Although the age of consent is 16 in Canada, an age of 18+ is required to purchase or view pornography. Most sex shops sell adult videos, which means that most sex toys are on sale only to adults.

Hungary 
The first Hungarian sex shop opened on 15 November 1989, before the end of communism in Hungary, at 14 Károly Boulevard in Budapest, under the name Intim Center, which still exists today. At that time, the three T-categories were so suddenly moved from the forbidden to the tolerated that even the press of the time reported the administrative uncertainties surrounding the sex shop in this way.

Italy 
The first sex shop in Italy was opened in 1972 in Milan by Angela Masia and her husband Ercole Sabbatini. This was the first "official" sex shop. Since then more sex shops have opened, mostly in Rome. In 2018 the city of Pistoia in Tuscany banned the opening of new sex shops in the city's history centre.

Japan 

In Japan, sex shops contain hentai magazines, adult videos and DVDs.

The Netherlands 

The first sex shops in the Netherlands were opened in the early 1970s, by entrepreneurs like Beate Uhse and Lasse Braun. The world's first Muslim-aimed online sex shop called El Asira opened in the Netherlands in 2010. It had 70,000 hits to the website in the first four days of operation.

Singapore 
Sex shops are extremely rare in Singapore. A few had been opened by 2005, but only about 1–2 currently exist. These shops mainly sell lingerie and various sex toys. Their goods can be seen through a store window.

South Africa 
After Nelson Mandela backed the anti-discrimination law that legalised sex toys, "Adult World" was established in 1994 as South Africa's first sex shop. Adult World came to operate a total of 52 shops within South Africa and 15 shops in Australia. Many religious Christian communities believed that the use of these adult lifestyle centres would lead to higher crime rates and attempted to organise mass demonstrations at their opening to force the closure of Adult World.

In July 1998, Adult World opened their largest adult lifestyle shop in Parow, Cape Town which they named "Adult World Warehouse". The adult movie star Christi Lake attended the opening of the shop, where a protest march of over 500 people brought traffic to a standstill. During the next couple of days the protesters held placards which proclaimed "Real men don't need pornography" and "Protect our people from banned pornography". When the shop was opened, it was found that 70% of the customer base were women who wished to learn more about adult lifestyle products.

As Adult World grew more popular, a focus on the development of adult shops within Australia took place.

United Kingdom 

Almost all licensed adult stores in the UK are forbidden from having their wares in open shop windows under the Indecent Displays Act 1981, which means often the shop fronts are boarded up or covered in posters. A warning sign must be clearly shown at the entrance to the store, and no sex articles (for example, pornography or sex toys) should be visible from the street. However, lingerie, non-offensive covers of adult material, etc. may be shown depending on the licence conditions of the local authority. The Video Recordings Act 1984 introduced the R18-rated classification for videos that are only available in licensed sex shops. No customer can be under 18 years old.

In London, few boroughs that have licensed sex shops. In the district of Soho within the City of Westminster a handful of sex shops were opened by Carl Slack in the early 1960s, and by the mid-1970s the number had grown to 59. Some had nominally "secret" backrooms selling hardcore photographs and novels, including Olympia Press editions.

By the 1980s, purges of corrupt police officers, along with new and tighter licensing controls by the City of Westminster, led to a crackdown on illegal premises in Soho. In the early 1990s, London's Hackney council sought to shut down Sh! Women's Erotic Emporium, because they did not have a licence. Sh! took the council to court and consequently won the right to remain open, as there were no sufficient reasons for the closure. In 2003, the Ann Summers chain of lingerie and sex toy shops won the right to advertise for shop assistants in Job Centres, which was originally banned under restrictions on what advertising could be carried out by the sex industry. In 2007, a Northern Ireland sex shop was denied a licence by the Belfast City Council. The shop appealed and won, but this was overturned by the House of Lords.

The licensing or closing of unlicensed sex shops, along with cultural changes such as the substantial relaxation of general censorship and the ready availability of non-commercial sex, and the availability of sexual material online, have reduced the red-light district of Soho to just a small area. The borough has 15 licensed sex shops and several remaining unlicensed ones. Islington and Camden each have multiple sex shops; the former also has three pornographic cinemas.

Sex shops in Scotland are regulated under the Civic Government (Scotland) Act 1982.

United States 

In the United States, a series of Supreme Court decisions in the 1960s (based on the First Amendment to the United States Constitution) generally legalized sex shops, while still allowing states and local jurisdictions to limit them through zoning. Zoning regulations often caused shops to be located either on the outskirts of town, or clumped into a single area, creating a type of red light district of adult stores and businesses. Into the 1980s, nearly all American sex shops were oriented to an almost entirely male clientele. Many included adult video arcades, and nearly all were designed so that their customers could not be seen from the street: they lacked windows, and the doors often involved an L-shaped turn so that people on the street could not see in. In addition, during the late 1980s and early 1990s, stores that also had theaters or arcades were sometimes closed by government order, citing the spread of AIDS as the motive.

On the one hand, there are stores resembling the UK's Ann Summers, tending toward "softer" product lines. On the other hand, there are stores that evolved specifically out of a sex-positive culture, such as San Francisco's Good Vibrations and Xandria. The latter class of stores tend to be very consciously community-oriented businesses, sponsoring lecture series and being actively involved in sex-related health issues, etc.

See also 
 Erotic furniture
 Sex machine

References 

 
Retailers by type of merchandise sold
Pornography